Porlieria hygrometra is an evergreen shrub growing to about 2 metres in height, endemic to Bolivia, Peru, and Chile.

References

 Syst. Veg. Fl. Peruv. Chil. 94 1798.
 The Ferns
 JSTOR Isotype of Porlieria hygrometra Ruiz & Pav.

hygrometra
Trees of Chile